Zhang Lei is a Chinese billionaire businessman and investor. He is the founder and chairman of the board of Hillhouse, the largest private equity firm operating in Asia as of October 2021.

Education and early career
Zhang received a scholarship to Renmin University of China, where he received a B.A. in Economics in 1994. In 2002, he received an MBA and M.A. in International Relations from Yale University. During his studies, Zhang interned at the Yale University Endowment. Zhang translated David Swensen's book, Pioneering Portfolio Management, An Unconventional Approach to Institutional Investment (2000), into Chinese while studying at Yale, which according to the Financial Times involved creating new Mandarin words for "endowment" and "fiduciary". He obtained certification as a chartered financial analyst (CFA). He was an investment analyst for a global emerging markets fund that covered South Africa, Southeast Asia and China. After this, he was the chief representative to China for the New York Stock Exchange and he established their Hong Kong and Beijing offices.

Hillhouse Capital
Zhang founded Hillhouse Capital in 2005. Hillhouse manages about US $50 billion of assets as of September 2018. Hillhouse is a long-term fundamental equity investor. It invests globally, with a particular focus on China and Asia. Hillhouse focuses on the consumer, TMT, industrials and healthcare sectors.

Executive positions
Zhang has served on or currently sits on the Board of Directors of: JD (formerly 360buy), Qunar (China's largest online travel vertical), Global Mediacom (Indonesia's largest media / TV / pay TV conglomerate), and Blue Moon (a Chinese household care company). Zhang holds roles at the Brookings Institution and he is a Governing Board Member of the China-United States Exchange Foundation, a non-profit organization established with the purpose of further improving communications and enhancing understanding between the peoples of China and the United States. He is a founding board member of the United World College (UWC) of Southeast Asia Foundation and he established the Gaoli Academy at Renmin University with the goal of expanding the role of liberal arts education in Chinese universities. Zhang is also Vice Chairman and Trustee of the Board at Renmin University of China. He is a Trustee of the Yale-NUS College and the Chair of the Yale Asia Development Council. He is also a member of the Hong Kong Financial Services Development Council. In June 2016 the governing board of Yale University, Yale Corporation, appointed Lei Zhang as a successor trustee.

Philanthropy 
Zhang Lei donated US$8.88 million to the Yale School of Management, which was the largest alumni donation in the history of the school. He also established Gaoli Academy  by donating money together with support from Renmin University. In 2010, Zhang Lei donated $1.4 million to his alma mater Renmin University of China. In 2017, he donated another $43 million for an education fund for the school and gave the commencement speech to the graduating class of 2017. Zhang started the Hillhouse Academy in association with Renmin University to prepare students in business for the technological revolution.

Zhang Lei is involved and holds roles with the BN Vocational School (BNVS) in China. BNVS started in 2005 as the first non-profit charitable vocational school at secondary school level in China that does not require fees. There are BNVS campuses in 1 foreign country: Angola and the 9 following cities: Beijing, Chengdu, Dalian, Lijiang, Nanjing, Sanya, Wuhan, Yinchuan and Zhengzhou.

Zhang funded a low-budget docudrama called Kang Rinpoche (Paths of the Soul) in 2017.

References

External links 
 张磊：给予才是最大的快乐
 对话高瓴资本创始人张磊：寻找伟大格局观的坚定实践者
 高礼研究院
 张磊对话史蒂芬•罗奇：中国进入转折点

1972 births
20th-century Chinese businesspeople
21st-century Chinese businesspeople
Businesspeople from Henan
Chinese company founders
Chinese financial analysts
Chinese investors
Chinese philanthropists
Chinese venture capitalists
Living people
People from Zhumadian
Renmin University of China alumni
Yale School of Management alumni
CFA charterholders
Chief investment officers
Chinese billionaires
Chinese chairpersons of corporations